Ramesh Krishnan (born 5 June 1961) is a tennis coach and former professional tennis player from India. As a junior player in the late 1970s, he won the singles titles at both, Wimbledon and the French Open. He went on to reach three Grand Slam quarterfinals in the 1980s and was a part of the Indian team captained by Vijay Amritraj which reached the final of the Davis Cup in 1987 against Sweden. Krishnan also beat then-world No. 1, Mats Wilander, at the 1989 Australian Open. He became India's Davis Cup captain in 2007.

Early life
Ramesh was born in Madras, India, and is the son of Ramanathan Krishnan who reached the Wimbledon semifinal twice in the 1960s. Ramesh emulated an achievement of his father's by winning the Wimbledon junior title in 1979. He also won the French Open junior title that year, and was ranked the No. 1 junior player in the world.

Career
At the senior level, Ramesh reached the quarterfinals at Wimbledon once (1986) and the US Open twice (1981 and 1987). He was admired for his touch, anticipation and all-round game, but his lack of a killer stroke or a strong service kept him from reaching the very top of the men's game.

Ramesh was a key member of the Indian team which reached the Davis Cup final in 1987. In the semifinals against Australia, he beat John Fitzgerald in four sets the opening singles match, and then defeated Wally Masur in straight sets the decisive fifth rubber to give India a 3–2 victory. However, in the final against Sweden, India was defeated 5–0 with Krishnan losing two singles matches to Mats Wilander and Anders Järryd and with the Indian team managing to win only one set. Ramesh was a stalwart on India's Davis Cup team from 1977 to 1993, compiling a 29–21 winning record (23–19 in singles and 6–2 in doubles).

At the 1992 Olympic Games in Barcelona, Ramesh reached the men's doubles quarterfinals partnering Leander Paes.

Ramesh retired from the professional tour in 1993. Over the course of his career, he won eight top-level singles titles and one doubles title; he also won four challenger singles titles (defeating the teenage Andre Agassi in the Schenectady final in 1986). His career-high singles ranking was world No. 23, in January 1985.

In 1998, Ramesh was awarded the Padma Shri by the Government of India in recognition of his achievements and contributions to Indian tennis.

Ramesh runs a tennis academy in Chennai, set up along the lines of similar institutions in the United States. He became India Davis Cup team captain in January 2007.

ATP career finals

Singles: 12 (8 titles, 4 runner-ups)

Doubles: 1 (1 title)

ATP Challenger and ITF Futures finals

Singles: 4 (4–0)

Doubles: 1 (0–1)

Junior Grand Slam finals

Singles: 2 (2 titles)

Performance timeline

Singles

Career highlights
1979 – Wimbledon and French Open junior singles champion.
1981 – Reached the quarterfinals of the US Open.
1981 – Won his first ATP singles title in Manila.
1986 – Reached the quarterfinals of Wimbledon.
1986 – Won the Japan Open.
1987 – Reached the quarterfinals of 1987 South Australian Open and 1987 Heineken Open in back to back weeks in January.
1987 – Reached the quarterfinals of the US Open.
1987 – Member of the Indian team which reached the final of the Davis Cup. (Krishnan won the decisive singles rubber against Australia in the semifinals. India went on to lose to Sweden in the final.)
1988 – Won the Wellington Open; runner-up in the ATP Auckland Open, Bristol Open and Rye Brook (New York) Open.
1989 – Defeated the then world No. 1, Mats Wilander, in the second round of the Australian Open.
1989 – Won the Auckland Open, reached the quarterfinals of the Schenectady Open and Washington DC Open in back to back weeks in July. He reached the quarterfinals of the 1989 Livingston Open.
1990 – Won the Schenectady Open and reached the semifinals of the 1990 Heineken Open.
1991 – Reached the quarterfinals of the Wellington Open.
1992 – Reached the semifinals of the Singapore Open.
1992 – Reached the quarterfinals of the men's doubles competition at the 1992 Summer Olympics in Barcelona with Leander Paes.

References

External links
 
 
 

French Open junior champions
Indian male tennis players
Olympic tennis players of India
Racket sportspeople from Chennai
Recipients of the Padma Shri in sports
Recipients of the Arjuna Award
Tamil sportspeople
Tennis players at the 1992 Summer Olympics
Wimbledon junior champions
1961 births
Living people
Grand Slam (tennis) champions in boys' singles